The Men's 200m athletics events for the 2012 Summer Paralympics took place at the London Olympic Stadium from August 31 to September 8. A total of 13 events were contested over this distance for 13 different classifications.

Schedule

Results

T11

 

 
Final

T12

 

 
Final

T13

 

 
Final

T34

 

 
Final

T35

 

 
Final

T36

 
There were no heats in this event. The final was competed on 6 September 2012 at 19:08.
 
Final

T37

 
The T37 category is for ambulant athletes with cerebral palsy. These athletes have movement and coordination problems on one half of their body. They have good ability in their dominant side of their body (i.e. hemiplegia).
 
Final

T38

 
The T38 category is for ambulant athletes with cerebral palsy. T38 athletes have the mildest form of impairment caused by cerebral palsy, often in only one limb, and not affecting the ability to run, walk or jump freely, although impairing performance. T38 athletes may suffer minor co-ordination difficulties.
 
Final

T42

 
There were no heats in this event. The final was competed on 1 September 2012 at 11:23.
 
Final

T44

 

 
Final

T46

 

 
Final

T52

 

 
Final

T53

 

 
Final

References

Athletics at the 2012 Summer Paralympics
2012 in men's athletics